Don't Argue may refer to:

 "Don't Argue" (song), a song by Cabaret Voltaire
 Don't Argue (TV series), an Australian television series